Kundakunda was a Digambara Jain monk and philosopher, who likely lived in the 2nd CE century CE or later.

His date of birth is māgha māsa, śukla pakṣa, pañcamī tithi, on the day of Vasant Panchami. 
He authored many Jain texts such as: Samayasara, Niyamasara, Pancastikayasara, Pravachanasara, Astapahuda and Barasanuvekkha. He occupies the highest place in the tradition of the Digambara Jain acharyas. All Digambara Jains say his name before starting to read the scripture. He spent most of his time at Ponnur Hills, Tamil Nadu and later part of life at Kundadri, Shimoga, Karnataka,

Names
His proper name was Padmanandin, he is popularly referred to as Kundakunda possibly because the modern village of Konakondla in Anantapur district of Andhra Pradesh which is his birth place. He is also presumed to be the one being alluded to by names such as Elacarya, Vakragriva, Grdhrapiccha or Mahamati. He is also called Thiruvalluvar, the author of tamil classical Thirukkural, besides many other cannons in jain literature.

Biography

Kundakunda belonged to the Digambara sect. Natubhai Shah places him in the second-century CE. Jayandra Soni places him in either the 2nd– or 3rd–century CE. Western scholars, however, place him much later primarily because of ideas he refers to and because his hagiography and quotations from his influential and important work begin to appear around 8th-century CE. For example, Paul Dundas dates him to about mid-8th-century.

In the Digambara tradition, Kundakunda's texts are among the most important and treasured. The reverence for his scholarship is such that some later texts such as Pravachanasara list him third in importance, right after Mahavira and Mahavira's disciple Indrabhuti Gautama. A.N. Upadhye in his critical edition of the Pravachansara suggests Kundakunda to have lived in the middle of the 2nd century CE.

Thought
In texts such as Pravacanasāra
(‘The Essence of the Doctrine’) and Samayasāra (‘The Essence of the Soul’), Kundakunda distinguishes between two perspectives of truth:

vyavahāranaya or ‘mundane perspective’, also delusion (moha)
niścayanaya or ‘ultimate perspective’, also called “supreme” (paramārtha) and “pure” (śuddha)

For Kundakunda, the mundane realm of truth is also the relative perspective of normal folk, where the workings of karma operate and where things emerge, last for a certain duration and perish. The mundane aspect is associated with the changing qualities of the soul mainly the influx of karmic particles. The ultimate perspective meanwhile, is that of the pure soul or atman, the jiva, which is "blissful, energetic, perceptive, and omniscient". Delusion and bondage is caused by the confusion of the workings of karma with the true nature of the soul, which is always pure, in other words, it is caused by taking the view of vyavahāranaya, not the higher niścayanaya which is the absolute perspective of a Jina - Kevala Jnana. His view has become the mainstream view in Digambara Jainism.

Works

The works attributed to Kundakunda, all of them in Prakrit, can be divided in three groups.

The first group comprises four original works described as "The Essence" (sara)—namely, the Niyamasāra (The Essence of the Restraint, in 187 verses), the Pañcāstikāyasāra (The Essence of the Five Existents, in 153 verses), the Samayasāra (The Essence of the Self, in 439 verses), and the Pravacanasāra (The Essence of the Teaching, in 275 verses).

The second group is a collection of ten bhaktis (devotional prayers), short compositions in praise of the acharya (Acharyabhakti), the scriptures (Srutabhakti), the mendicant conduct (Charitrabhakti), and so forth. They form the standard liturgical texts used by the Digambara in their daily rituals and bear close resemblance to similar texts employed by the Śvētāmbara, suggesting the possibility of their origin in the canonical period prior to the division of the community.

The last group consists of eight short texts called Prabhrta (Pkt. pahuda, i.e., a gift or a treatise), probably compilations from some older sources, on such topics as the right view (Darsanaprabhrta, in 36 verses), right conduct (Charitraprabhrta, in 44 verses), the scripture (Sutraprabhrta, in 27 verses), and so forth.

See also
 Simandhar Swami
 Kundadri
 Taran Svami

Notes

References

External links

Jain Literature and Kundakunda
Acharya Kundkund

2nd-century BC births
Year of death unknown
Jain acharyas
Jain philosophy
1st-century BC Indian writers
Indian Jain writers
Indian Jain monks
1st-century BC Indian Jains
1st-century BC Jain monks
1st-century BC Indian monks
Indian male writers